Çamlıyayla can refer to:

 Çamlıyayla
 Çamlıyayla, Kemah
 Çamlıyayla, Narman